Events from the year 1902 in Russia.

Incumbents
 Monarch – Nicholas II

Events
1 July - The Admiral Makarov National University of Shipbuilding opens in Mykolayiv, Ukraine, under the name of Mykolayiv Industrial Technical School.
July - Grand Duke Peter Nikolaevich of Russia is created a Knight of the Order of the Most Holy Annunciation by King Victor Emmanuel III of Italy, during the latter's visit to Russia.
29 August - Grand Duchess Elena Vladimirovna of Russia is married to her second cousin Prince Nicholas of Greece and Denmark.
November - The periodical Novy Put is launched in Saint Petersburg by Dmitry Merezhkovsky and Zinaida Gippius. 
December - The Russian News Agency TASS begins life as the Commercial Telegraph Agency (TTA, Torgovo-Telegrafnoe Agentstvo).

Births
21 May - Anatole Litvak, filmmaker (died 1974)
11 October - Yitzhak Yitzhaky, Slovenian-born Israeli politician (died 1955

Deaths
2 January - Prince Balakishi Arablinski, Azerbaijani general in the Russian Imperial Army (born 1828)
June - Isaac Andreyevich Chatzkin, Russian-Jewish physician (born 1832)

References

 
Years of the 20th century in the Russian Empire